The 1982 FIFA World Cup was the 12th FIFA World Cup, a quadrennial football tournament for men's senior national teams, and was played in Spain between 13 June and 11 July 1982. The tournament was won by Italy, who defeated West Germany 3–1 in the final, held in the Santiago Bernabéu Stadium in the capital, Madrid. It was Italy's third World Cup title, but their first since 1938. The defending champions, Argentina, were eliminated in the second round (finishing third and last in their group). Algeria, Cameroon, Honduras, Kuwait and New Zealand made their first appearances in the finals.

The tournament featured the first penalty shoot-out in World Cup competition. This was the third and last World Cup to feature two rounds of group stages. It was also the third time (after 1934 and 1966) in which all four semi-finalists were European.

In the first round of Group 3, Hungary defeated El Salvador 10–1, equalling the largest margin of victory recorded in the finals (Hungary over South Korea 9–0 in 1954, and Yugoslavia over Zaire 9–0 in 1974).

Although successful and filled with compelling and entertaining matches, this tournament was blighted by violent fouls, some poor officiating and some overcrowded stadiums. One particular incident of note was West German goalkeeper Harald Schumacher's foul of French player Patrick Battiston during a semi-final match in Seville, and another was Italian player Claudio Gentile's intense and often violent match-long fouling and marking of Argentine player Diego Maradona. FIFA changed the regulations to somewhat prevent this kind of brutality on the pitch for the subsequent tournament in Mexico.

Host selection

Spain was chosen as the host nation by FIFA in London on 6 July 1966. Hosting rights for the 1974 and 1978 tournaments were awarded at the same time. West Germany and Spain agreed a deal whereby Spain would support West Germany for the 1974 tournament and West Germany would allow Spain to bid for the 1982 World Cup unopposed. 

At the time of Spain being selected, the country was under the dictatorship of Francisco Franco's regime, but his regime had ended before the start of the tournament, and the World Cup had its effects on Spanish society after the democratic transition.

Qualification

For the first time, the World Cup finals expanded from 16 to 24 teams. This allowed more countries to participate from Africa and Asia.

Teams absent from the finals were 1974 and 1978 runners-up Netherlands (eliminated by Belgium and France), Mexico (eliminated by Honduras and El Salvador), and the three times 1970s participants Sweden (eliminated by Scotland and Northern Ireland). Northern Ireland qualified for the first time since 1958. Belgium, Czechoslovakia, El Salvador, England and the Soviet Union were all back in the finals after 12-year absences. England had its first successful World Cup qualifying campaign in 20 years, having qualified automatically as hosts in 1966 and as defending champions in 1970, then failing to qualify in 1974 and 1978. Yugoslavia and Chile were also back after missing the 1978 tournament.

Algeria, Cameroon, Honduras, Kuwait, and New Zealand all participated in the World Cup for the first time. As of 2022, this was the last time that El Salvador and Kuwait qualified for a FIFA World Cup finals, as well as the last time that South Korea failed to qualify. This is also the last time that Mexico failed to qualify by playing (they were banned from the 1990 FIFA World Cup qualification).

There was some consideration given as to whether England, Northern Ireland, and Scotland should withdraw from the tournament because of the Falklands War between Argentina and the United Kingdom. A directive issued by the British sports minister Neil Macfarlane in April, at the start of the conflict, suggested that there should be no contact between British representative teams and Argentina. This directive was not rescinded until August, following the end of hostilities. Macfarlane reported to Prime Minister Margaret Thatcher that some players and officials were uneasy about participating because of the casualties suffered by British forces, and the strong diplomatic ties between Argentina and Spain. FIFA advised the British Government that there was no prospect that Argentina (the defending champions) would be asked to withdraw. It also became apparent that no other countries would withdraw from the tournament. It was decided by Cabinet Secretary Robert Armstrong to allow the British national teams to participate so that Argentina could not use their absence for propaganda purposes, reversing the intended effect of applying political pressure onto Argentina.

List of qualified teams

The following 24 teams qualified for the final tournament.

AFC (1)
 
CAF (2)
 
 
OFC (1)
 

CONCACAF (2)
 
 
CONMEBOL (4)
 
 
 
 

UEFA (14)
 
 
 
 
 
 
 
 
 
 
 
  (hosts)

Summary

Format

The first round was a round-robin group stage containing six groups of four teams each. Two points were awarded for a win and one for a draw, with goal difference used to separate teams equal on points. The top two teams in each group advanced. In the second round, the twelve remaining teams were split into four groups of three teams each, with the winner of each group progressing to the knockout semi-final stage.

The composition of the groups in the second round was determined before the start of the tournament. Groups A and B were to include one team from each of Groups 1 through 6, and Groups C and D included the remaining six teams. The winners of Groups 1 and 3 were in Group A whilst the runners-up were in Group C. The winners of Groups 2 and 4 were in Group B whilst the runners-up were in Group D. The winner of Group 5 was in Group D whilst the runner-up was in Group B. The winner of Group 6 was in Group C whilst the runner-up was in Group A. Thus, Group A mirrored Group C, and Group B mirrored Group D with the winners and runners-up from the first round being placed into opposite groups in the second round.

The second-round groups that mirrored each other (based on the first-round groupings) faced off against each other in the semifinals. Thus, the Group A winner played the Group C winner, and the Group B winner played the Group D winner. This meant that if two teams which played in the same first-round group both emerged from the second round, they would meet for the second time of the tournament in a semifinal match. It also guaranteed that the final match would feature two teams that had not previously played each other in the tournament. As it turned out, Italy and Poland who were both in Group 1 in the first round, each won their second-round groups and played each other in a semifinal match.

First group stage

In Group 1, newcomers Cameroon held both Poland and Italy to draws, and were denied a place in the next round on the basis of having scored fewer goals than Italy (the sides had an equal goal difference). Poland and Italy qualified over Cameroon and Peru. Italian journalists and tifosi criticised their team for their uninspired performances that managed three draws; the squad was reeling from the recent Serie A scandal, where national players were suspended for match fixing and illegal betting.

Group 2 saw one of the great World Cup upsets on the first day with the 2–1 victory of Algeria over reigning European Champions West Germany. In the final match in the group, West Germany met Austria in a match later dubbed as the "Disgrace of Gijón". Algeria had already played their final group game the day before, and West Germany and Austria knew that a West German win by 1 or 2 goals would qualify them both, while a larger German victory would qualify Algeria over Austria, and a draw or an Austrian win would eliminate the Germans. After 10 minutes of all-out attack, West Germany scored through a goal by Horst Hrubesch. After the goal was scored, the two teams kicked the ball around aimlessly for the rest of the match. Chants of "Fuera, fuera" ("Out, out") were screamed by the Spanish crowd, while angry Algerian supporters waved banknotes at the players. This performance was widely deplored, even by the German and Austrian fans. One German fan was so upset by his team's display that he burned his German flag in disgust. Algeria protested to FIFA, who ruled that the result be allowed to stand; FIFA introduced a revised qualification system at subsequent World Cups in which the final two games in each group were played simultaneously.

Group 3, where the opening ceremony and first match of the tournament took place, saw Belgium beat defending champions Argentina 1–0. The Camp Nou stadium was the home of Barcelona, and many fans had wanted to see the club's new signing, Argentinian star Diego Maradona, who did not perform to expectations. Both Belgium and Argentina ultimately advanced at the expense of Hungary and El Salvador despite Hungary's 10–1 win over the Central American nation – which, with a total of 11 goals, is the second highest scoreline in a World Cup game (equal with Brazil's 6–5 victory over Poland in the 1938 tournament and Hungary's 8–3 victory over West Germany in the 1954 tournament).

Group 4 opened with England midfielder Bryan Robson's goal against France after only 27 seconds of play. England won 3–1 and qualified along with France over Czechoslovakia and Kuwait, though the tiny Gulf emirate held Czechoslovakia to a 1–1 draw. In the game between Kuwait and France, with France leading 3–1, France midfielder Alain Giresse scored a goal vehemently contested by the Kuwait team, who had stopped play after hearing a piercing whistle from the stands, which they thought had come from Soviet referee Miroslav Stupar. Play had not yet resumed when Sheikh Fahad Al-Ahmed Al-Jaber Al-Sabah, brother of the then-Kuwaiti Emir and president of the Kuwait Football Association, rushed onto the pitch to remonstrate with the referee. Stupar reversed his initial decision and disallowed the goal to the fury of the French. Maxime Bossis scored another valid goal a few minutes later and France won 4–1.

In Group 5, Honduras held hosts Spain to a 1–1 draw. Northern Ireland won the group outright, eliminating Yugoslavia and beating hosts Spain 1–0; Northern Ireland had to play the majority of the second half with ten men after Mal Donaghy was dismissed. Spain scraped by thanks to a controversial penalty in the 2–1 victory over Yugoslavia. At 17 years and 41 days, Northern Ireland forward Norman Whiteside was the youngest player to appear in a World Cup match.

Brazil were in Group 6. With Zico, Sócrates, Falcão, Éder and others, they boasted an offensive firepower that promised a return to the glory days of 1970. They beat the USSR 2–1 thanks to a 20-metre Éder goal two minutes from time, then Scotland and New Zealand with four goals each. The Soviets took the group's other qualifying berth on goal difference at the expense of the Scots.

Second group stage

Poland opened Group A with a 3–0 defeat of Belgium thanks to a Zbigniew Boniek hat-trick. The Soviet Union prevailed 1–0 in the next match over Belgium. The Poles edged out the USSR for the semi-final spot on the final day on goal difference thanks to a 0–0 draw in a politically charged match, as Poland's then-Communist government had imposed a martial law a few months earlier to quash internal dissent.

In Group B, a match between England and West Germany ended in a goalless draw. West Germany put the pressure on England in their second match by beating Spain 2–1. The home side drew 0–0 against England, denying Ron Greenwood's team a semi-final place and putting England in the same position as Cameroon, being eliminated without losing a game.

In Group C, with Brazil, Argentina and Italy, in the opener, Italy prevailed 2–1 over Diego Maradona and Mario Kempes's side after a game in which Italian defenders Gaetano Scirea and Claudio Gentile proved themselves equal to the task of stopping the Argentinian attack. Argentina now needed a win over Brazil on the second day, but lost 3–1 – Argentina only scoring in the last minute. Maradona kicked Brazilian player João Batista in the groin and was sent off in the 85th minute.

The match between Brazil and Italy pitted Brazil's attack against Italy's defence, with the majority of the game played around the Italian area, and with the Italian midfielders and defenders returning the repeated set volleys of Brazilian shooters such as Zico, Sócrates and Falcão. Italian centre back Gentile was assigned to mark Brazilian striker Zico, earning a yellow card and a suspension for the semi-final. Paolo Rossi opened the scoring when he headed in Antonio Cabrini's cross with just five minutes played. Sócrates equalised for Brazil seven minutes later. In the twenty-fifth minute Rossi stepped past Júnior, intercepted a pass from Cerezo across the Brazilians' goal, and drilled the shot home. The Brazilians threw everything in search of another equaliser, while Italy defended bravely. On 68 minutes, Falcão collected a pass from Júnior and as Cerezo's dummy run distracted three defenders, fired home from 20 yards out. Now Italy had gained the lead twice thanks to Rossi's goals, and Brazil had come back twice; at 2–2, Brazil would have been through on goal difference, but in the 74th minute, a poor clearance from an Italian corner kick went back to the Brazilian six-yard line where Rossi and Francesco Graziani were waiting. Both aimed at the same shot, Rossi connecting to get a hat trick and sending Italy into the lead for good. In the 86th minute Giancarlo Antognoni scored an apparent fourth goal for Italy, but it was wrongly disallowed for offside. In the dying moments Dino Zoff made a miraculous save to deny Oscar a goal, ensuring that Italy advanced to the semi-final.

In the last group, Group D, France dispatched Austria 1–0 with a free kick goal by Bernard Genghini, and then defeated Northern Ireland 4–1 to reach their first semi-final since 1958.

Semi-finals, third-place match and final

In a re-match of the encounter in the first round, Italy beat Poland in the first semi-final through two goals from Paolo Rossi. In the game between France and West Germany, the Germans opened the scoring through a Pierre Littbarski strike in the 17th minute, and the French equalised nine minutes later with a Michel Platini penalty. In the second half a long through ball sent French defender Patrick Battiston racing clear towards the German goal. With both Battiston and the lone German defender trying to be the first to reach the ball, Battiston flicked it past German keeper Harald Schumacher from the edge of the German penalty area and Schumacher reacted by jumping up to block. Schumacher did not seem to go for the ball, however, and clattered straight into the oncoming Battiston – which left the French player unconscious and knocked two of his teeth out. Schumacher's action has been described as "one of history's most shocking fouls". The ball went just wide of the post and Dutch referee Charles Corver deemed Schumacher's tackle on Battiston not to be a foul and awarded a goal kick. Play was interrupted for several minutes while Battiston, still unconscious and with a broken jaw, was carried off the field on a stretcher.

After French defender Manuel Amoros had sent a 25-metre drive crashing onto the West German crossbar in the final minute, the match went into extra time. On 92 minutes, France's sweeper Marius Trésor fired a swerving volley under Schumacher's crossbar from ten metres out to make it 2–1. Six minutes later, an unmarked Alain Giresse drove in an 18-metre shot off the inside of the right post to finish off a counter-attack and put France up 3–1. But West Germany would not give up. In the 102nd minute a counter-attack culminated in a cross that recent substitute Karl-Heinz Rummenigge turned in at the near post from a difficult angle with the outside of his foot, reducing France's lead to 3–2. Then in the 108th minute Germany took a short corner and after France failed to clear, the ball was played by Germany to Littbarski whose cross to Horst Hrubesch was headed back to the centre towards Klaus Fischer, who was unmarked but with his back to goal. Fischer in turn volleyed the ball past French keeper Jean-Luc Ettori with a bicycle kick, levelling the scores at 3–3.

The resulting penalty shootout was the first at a World Cup finals. Giresse, Manfred Kaltz, Manuel Amoros, Paul Breitner and Dominique Rocheteau all converted penalties until Uli Stielike was stopped by Ettori, giving France the advantage. But then Schumacher stepped forward, lifted the tearful Stielike from the ground, and saved Didier Six's shot. With Germany handed the lifeline they needed Littbarski converted his penalty, followed by Platini for France, and then Rummenigge for Germany as the tension mounted. France defender Maxime Bossis then had his kick parried by Schumacher who anticipated it, and Hrubesch stepped up to score and send Germany to the World Cup final yet again with a victory on penalties, 5–4.

In the third-place match, Poland edged the French side 3–2 which matched Poland's best performance at a World Cup previously achieved in 1974. France would go on to win the European Championship two years later.

In the final, Antonio Cabrini fired a penalty wide of goal in the first half. In the second half, Paolo Rossi scored first for the third straight game by heading home Gentile's bouncing cross at close range. Exploiting the situation, Italy scored twice more on quick counter-strikes, all the while capitalising on their defence to hold the Germans. With Gentile and Gaetano Scirea holding the centre, the Italian strikers were free to counter-punch the weakened German defence. Marco Tardelli's shot from the edge of the area beat Schumacher first, and Alessandro Altobelli, the substitute for injured striker Francesco Graziani, made it 3–0 at the end of a solo sprint down the right side by the stand-out winger Bruno Conti. Italy's lead appeared secure, encouraging Italian president Sandro Pertini to wag his finger at the cameras in a playful "not going to catch us now" gesture. In the 83rd minute, Paul Breitner scored for West Germany, but it was only a consolation goal as Italy won 3–1 to claim their first World Cup title in 44 years, and their third in total.

Records
Italy became the first team to advance from the first round without winning a game, drawing all three (while Cameroon were eliminated in the same way by virtue of having only one goal scored against Italy's two), and also the only World Cup winner to draw or lose three matches at the Finals. By winning, Italy equalled Brazil's record of winning the World Cup three times. Italy's total of twelve goals scored in seven matches set a new low for average goals scored per game by a World Cup winning side (subsequently exceeded by Spain in 2010), while Italy's aggregate goal difference of +6 for the tournament remains a record low for a champion, equalled by Spain.

Italy's 40-year-old captain-goalkeeper Dino Zoff became the oldest player to win the World Cup. This was the first World Cup in which teams from all six continental confederations participated in the finals, something that did not happen again until 2006.

Venues
17 stadiums in 14 cities hosted the tournament, a record that stood until the 2002 tournament, which was played in 20 stadiums in two countries. The most used venue was FC Barcelona's Camp Nou stadium, which hosted five matches, including a semi-final; it was the largest stadium used for this tournament. With Sarrià Stadium also hosting three matches, Barcelona was the Spanish city with the most matches in España 1982 with eight; Madrid, the nation's capital, followed with seven.

This particular World Cup was organised in such a way that all of the matches of each of the six groups were assigned stadiums in cities near to each other, in order to reduce the stress of travel on the players and fans. For example, Group 1 matches were played in Vigo and A Coruña, Group 2 in Gijón and Oviedo, Group 3 in Elche and Alicante (except for the first match, which was the opening match of the tournament, which was played at the Camp Nou), Group 4 in Bilbao and Valladolid, Group 5 (which included hosts Spain) in Valencia and Zaragoza, and Group 6 in Seville and Malaga (of the three first-round matches in Seville, the first match between Brazil and the Soviet Union was played in the Pizjuán Stadium, and the other two were played in the Villamarín Stadium). Group stage matches in the milder northern cities like Bilbao or Gijon would start at 17:00, while the matches in the southern cities like Seville or Valencia would start at 21:00, in an attempt to avoid the intense southern Spanish summer heat.

When the tournament went into the round-robin second round matches, all the aforementioned cities excluding Barcelona, Alicante and Seville did not host any more matches in España 1982. Both the Santiago Bernabéu and Vicente Calderón stadiums in Madrid and the Sarrià Stadium in Barcelona were used for the first time for this tournament for the second round matches. Madrid and Barcelona hosted the four second round group matches; Barcelona hosted Groups A and C (Camp Nou hosted all three of Group A's matches, and Sarrià did the same with Group C's matches) and Madrid hosted Groups B and D (Real Madrid's Bernabeu Stadium hosted all three of Group B's matches, and Atlético Madrid's Calderon Stadium did the same with the Group D matches)

The two semi final matches were held at Camp Nou and the Pizjuán Stadium in Seville, the third largest stadium used for the tournament (one of only two España 1982 matches it hosted), the third place match was held in Alicante and the final was held at the Bernabeu, the second largest stadium used for this tournament.

Match officials

AFC
  Ibrahim Youssef Al-Doy
  Chan Tam Sun
  Abraham Klein
CAF
  Benjamin Dwomoh
  Yousef El-Ghoul
  Belaid Lacarne
CONCACAF
  Rómulo Méndez
  Mario Rubio Vázquez
  Luis Paulino Siles
  David Socha

CONMEBOL
  Gilberto Aristizábal
  Luis Barrancos
  Juan Daniel Cardellino
  Gastón Castro
  Arnaldo Cézar Coelho
  Arturo Ithurralde
  Enrique Labo Revoredo
  Héctor Ortiz
UEFA
  Paolo Casarin
  Vojtech Christov
  Charles Corver
  Bogdan Dotchev
  Walter Eschweiler
  Erik Fredriksson
  Bruno Galler
  António Garrido
  Alojzy Jarguz
  Augusto Lamo Castillo
  Henning Lund-Sørensen
  Damir Matovinović
  Malcolm Moffat
  Károly Palotai
  Alexis Ponnet
  Adolf Prokop
  Nicolae Rainea
  Miroslav Stupar
  Bob Valentine
  Michel Vautrot
  Clive White
  Franz Wöhrer
OFC
  Tony Boskovic

Squads
For a list of all squads that appeared in the final tournament, see 1982 FIFA World Cup squads.

Groups

Seeding
The 24 qualifiers were divided into four groupings which formed the basis of the draw for the group stage. FIFA announced the six seeded teams on the day of the draw and allocated them in advance to the six groups; as had become standard, the host nation and the reigning champions were among the seeds. The seeded teams would play all their group matches at the same venue (with the exception of World Cup holders Argentina who would play in the opening game scheduled for the Camp Nou, the largest of the venues). The remaining 18 teams were split into three pots based on FIFA's assessment of the team's strength, but also taking in account geographic considerations. The seedings and group venues for those teams were tentatively agreed at an informal meeting in December 1981 but not officially confirmed until the day of the draw. FIFA executive Hermann Neuberger told the press that the seeding of England had been challenged by other nations but they were to be seeded as "the Spanish want England to play in Bilbao for security reasons"*. As well as security the footballing grounds that they were winners in 1966 and reached the quarter-final as holders in 1970, as the 1970 in Mexico and 1974 in West Germany tournaments were taken into consideration for seeding with West Germany seeded for their 1980 European Championship win (due to the Netherlands failing to qualify) having won in 1974. However, due to England's seeding for security reasons, if the Netherlands had qualified, West Germany would not have been seeded as West Germany were eliminated in the second group stage in 1978, while the Netherlands were runners up.

Final draw
On 16 January 1982, the draw was conducted at the Palacio de Congresos in Madrid, where the teams were drawn out from the three pots to be placed with the seeded teams in their predetermined groups. Firstly a draw was made to decide the order in which the three drums containing pots A, B and C would be emptied. The teams were then drawn one-by-one and entered in the groups in that order. A number was then drawn to determine the team's "position" in the group and hence the fixtures.

The only stipulation of the draw was that no group could feature two South American teams. As a result, Pot B – which contained two South American teams – was initially drawn containing only the four Europeans, which were then to be immediately allocated to Groups 3 and 6 which contained the two South American seeds Argentina and Brazil. Once these two groups had been filled with the entrants from Pot B, then Chile and Peru would be added to the pot and the draw continue as normal. In the event, FIFA executives Sepp Blatter and Hermann Neuberger conducting the draw initially forgot this stipulation and immediately placed the first team drawn from this pot (Belgium) into Group 1, rather than Group 3 before then placing the second team drawn out (Scotland) into Group 3; they then had to correct this by moving Belgium to Group 3 and Scotland into Group 6. The ceremony suffered further embarrassment when one of the revolving drums containing the teams broke down.

Results
All times are Central European Summer Time (UTC+2)

First group stage
The group winners and runners-up advanced to the second round.

Teams were ranked on the following criteria:

 Greater number of points in all group matches
 Goal difference in all group matches
 Greater number of goals scored in all group matches
 Drawing of lots

Group 1

Group 2

Group 3

Group 4

Group 5

Group 6

Second group stage
The second round of the tournament consisted of four groups of three teams, each played at one stadium in one of Spain's two largest cities: two in Madrid and two in Barcelona. The winners of each group progressed to the semi-finals.

Teams were ranked on the following criteria:

 Greater number of points in all group matches
 Goal difference in all group matches
 Greater number of goals scored in all group matches
 Whether the team finished first or second in their first round group
 Drawing of lots

Although the fixtures were provisionally determined in advance, the teams competing in each fixture depended on the result of the opening match in each group: Should a team lose their opening game of the group, that team would then have to play in the second fixture against the third team in the group and the winner would, by contrast, be rewarded by not needing to play again until the final fixture of the group and therefore gained extra recovery time. If the opening game was a draw, the predetermined order of games would proceed as planned. These regulations helped ensure that the final group games were of importance as no team could already have progressed to the semi-finals by the end of the second fixtures.

The 43,000-capacity Sarria Stadium in Barcelona, used for the Group C round-robin matches between Italy, Argentina and Brazil was, unlike any of the other matches (except 1) in the other groups, severely overcrowded for all 3 matches. The venue was then heavily criticised for its lack of space and inability to handle such rampant crowds; although no one had foreseen such crowds at all; the Group A matches held at the nearby and much larger 121,401-capacity Camp Nou stadium never went past 65,000 and hosted all European teams; it was anticipated there would be larger crowds for the Camp Nou-hosted second round matches between Belgium, the Soviet Union and Poland.

Group A

Group B

Group C

Group D

Knockout stage

Semi-finals

Third place match

Final

Statistics

Goalscorers
Paolo Rossi received the Golden Boot for scoring six goals. In total, 146 goals were scored by 100 players, with only one of them credited as own goal.

6 goals
 Paolo Rossi
5 goals
 Karl-Heinz Rummenigge
4 goals
 Zico
 Zbigniew Boniek
3 goals
 Falcão
 Alain Giresse
 László Kiss
 Gerry Armstrong
2 goals

 Salah Assad
 Daniel Bertoni
 Diego Maradona
 Daniel Passarella
 Walter Schachner
 Éder
 Serginho
 Sócrates
 Antonín Panenka
 Trevor Francis
 Bryan Robson
 Bernard Genghini
 Michel Platini
 Dominique Rocheteau
 Didier Six
 László Fazekas
 Tibor Nyilasi
 Gábor Pölöskei
 Marco Tardelli
 Billy Hamilton
 John Wark
 Klaus Fischer
 Pierre Littbarski

1 goal

 Lakhdar Belloumi
 Tedj Bensaoula
 Rabah Madjer
 Osvaldo Ardiles
 Ramón Díaz
 Reinhold Hintermaier
 Hans Krankl
 Bruno Pezzey
 Ludo Coeck
 Alexandre Czerniatynski
 Erwin Vandenbergh
 Júnior
 Oscar
 Grégoire M'Bida
 Juan Carlos Letelier
 Gustavo Moscoso
 Miguel Ángel Neira
 Luis Ramírez Zapata
 Paul Mariner
 Maxime Bossis
 Alain Couriol
 René Girard
 Gérard Soler
 Marius Trésor
 Eduardo Laing
 Héctor Zelaya
 Lázár Szentes
 József Tóth
 József Varga
 Alessandro Altobelli
 Antonio Cabrini
 Bruno Conti
 Francesco Graziani
 Abdullah Al-Buloushi
 Faisal Al-Dakhil
 Steve Sumner
 Steve Wooddin
 Rubén Toribio Díaz
 Guillermo La Rosa
 Andrzej Buncol
 Włodzimierz Ciołek
 Janusz Kupcewicz
 Grzegorz Lato
 Stefan Majewski
 Włodzimierz Smolarek
 Andrzej Szarmach
 Steve Archibald
 Kenny Dalglish
 Joe Jordan
 David Narey
 John Robertson
 Graeme Souness
 Andriy Bal
 Sergei Baltacha
 Oleh Blokhin
 Aleksandre Chivadze
 Yuri Gavrilov
 Khoren Oganesian
 Ramaz Shengelia
 Juanito
 Roberto López Ufarte
 Enrique Saura
 Jesús María Zamora
 Paul Breitner
 Horst Hrubesch
 Uwe Reinders
 Ivan Gudelj
 Vladimir Petrović

Own goals
  Jozef Barmoš (against England)

Red cards
  Américo Gallego
  Diego Maradona
  Ladislav Vízek
  Gilberto Yearwood
  Mal Donaghy

Awards
Source:

FIFA retrospective ranking
In 1986, FIFA published a report that ranked all teams in each World Cup up to and including 1986, based on progress in the competition, overall results and quality of the opposition. The rankings for the 1982 tournament were as follows:

Branding

Mascot

The official mascot of this World Cup was Naranjito, an anthropomorphised orange, a typical fruit in Spain, wearing the kit of the host's national team. Its name comes from naranja, the Spanish word for orange, and the diminutive suffix "-ito".

The official poster was designed by Joan Miró.

Football in Action (fútbol en acción) was the name of an educational animated series first aired in 1982 on public broadcaster RTVE. Chapters had a duration of 20 minutes and the main character was Naranjito. The series lasted for 26 episodes and the theme was football, adventures and World Cup of 82. Naranjito was accompanied by other characters, as his girlfriend Clementina, his friend Citronio and Imarchi the robot.

Match ball
The match ball for 1982 World Cup, manufactured by Adidas, was the Tango España.

References

External links

1982 FIFA World Cup Spain, FIFA.com
Details at RSSSF
FIFA Technical Report (Part 1), (Part 2) and (Part 3)
FIFA Awards – World Cup 1982 "Golden Ball"

 
FIFA World Cup tournaments
International association football competitions hosted by Spain
WorldWorldW
June 1982 sports events in Europe
July 1982 sports events in Europe